What You Know bout Me? is a studio album by Messy Marv in 2006.

Track listing
Intro
Land of Trill (featuring David Banner)
I See, You Buy (featuring Selau)
Nigga Wit the Sac
Phone Skit #1
Bitch I'm Fresh (featuring Pastor Troy & Andre Nickatina)
Oh (featuring Keyshia Cole)
Come Fuck Wit Us (featuring San Quinn & V-White Of The Delinquents)
You Can Be My Nigga (featuring Selau)
Phone Skit #2
Neva Forget (featuring Outlawz)
Dem' Boys (featuring Click Clack Gang)
I'm From The Bay (featuring Jessica Rabbit & Matt Blaque) Produced By The Slapboyz
Phone Skit #3
Outro

2006 albums
Messy Marv albums